Sydney George Fairbairn MC (13 October 1892 – 19 January 1943) was an English cricketer and British Army officer.  The son of Victorian rower Steve Fairbairn and Eleanor Sharwood, he was born in "Carrick" Potts Point, New South Wales.

Fairbairn made his first-class debut for the Marylebone Cricket Club against Barbados, during the MCC tour of the West Indies in early 1913.  The remainder of his 7 first-class matches came on this tour, with his final appearance coming against British Guiana. In his 8 first-class appearances on tour, he scored 241 runs at an average of 20.08, which included a single half century score against British Guiana, in which he made an unbeaten 62. As an all-rounder, he took 12 wickets at a bowling average of 31.08, with best figures of 3/55. In that year's English cricket season, Fairbairn made his Minor Counties Championship for Buckinghamshire against Wiltshire.  He made 6 further Minor Counties Championship matches for Buckinghamshire, the last coming against Wiltshire in 1914.

During the course of the First World War he had a short-lived marriage to Nancy Cunard, a writer, heiress and political activist. Their marriage lasted less than two years before they separated. In 1926 Fairbairn married Angela Maude, daughter of Onslow Powell Traherne (her mother Muriel married secondly Cecil Francis William Fane, of the family of the Earls of Westmorland; Angela was given the surname of 'Fane' in 1912) who survived him.

Fairbairn joined the Royal Buckinghamshire Hussars before the start of the First World War and was later wounded at Gallipoli. He joined up again in 1916 this time with the Grenadier Guards and was awarded the Military Cross in 1919. He re-joined the Guards in the Second World War and died on active service in London on 19 January 1943.

He was buried at St Nicholas Church, Steventon, Hampshire.

Honours and awards
10 December 1919 Lt Sydney George Fairbairn of the Grenadier Guards (Special Reserve) and attached to the 3rd Battalion is awarded the Military Cross:

Notes and references
Notes

References

External links
Sydney Fairbairn at ESPNcricinfo
Sydney Fairbairn at CricketArchive

1892 births
1943 deaths
English cricketers
Marylebone Cricket Club cricketers
Buckinghamshire cricketers
British Army personnel of World War I
Recipients of the Military Cross
Grenadier Guards officers
Royal Buckinghamshire Yeomanry officers
Sydney
Cunard family
British Army personnel killed in World War II
Military personnel from New South Wales